Robert Alexander Stewart Macalister (8 July 1870 – 26 April 1950) was an Irish archaeologist.

Biography
Macalister was born in Dublin, Ireland, the son of Alexander Macalister, then Professor of Zoology, University of Dublin.  His father was appointed professor of anatomy at Cambridge University in 1883, and he was educated at The Perse School, and then studied at Cambridge University.

Although his earliest interest was in the archaeology of Ireland, he soon developed a strong interest in biblical archaeology.  Along with Frederick J. Bliss, he excavated several towns in the Shephelah region of Ottoman Palestine from 1898 to 1900.  Using advances in stratigraphy building on the work of Flinders Petrie, they developed a chronology for the region using ceramic typology.  Upon Bliss' retirement, Macalister became director of excavations for the Palestine Exploration Fund (PEF) in 1901.

From 1902 to 1909 he was responsible for the excavations at Gezer, in the modern state of Israel, just west of Jerusalem.  This was one of the earliest large-scale scientific archaeological excavations in the region.  The Gezer calendar found there is a very early paleo-Hebrew calendrical inscription.

Macalister left the field of Biblical archaeology in 1909 to accept a position as professor of Celtic archaeology at University College, Dublin, where he taught until his retirement in 1943.   During this period, he worked at the ancient Irish royal site at the Hill of Tara and was responsible for editing the catalogue of all known ogham inscriptions from Great Britain and Ireland.  Many of his translations of Irish myths and legends are still widely used today. He was elected to the Royal Irish Academy in 1910 and served as their president from 1926 to 1931. He was also president of the Royal Society of Antiquaries of Ireland from 1924 to 1928.

He is buried at the Parish of the Ascension Burial Ground in Cambridge, with his wife Margaret A. M. Macalister.

Published works

Vol.1, alt link
Vol.II, alt link
Vol.III [Plates], alt link

Part I, 34, 1938, 
Part II, 35, 1939, 
Part III, 39, 1940, 
Part IV, 41, 1941, 
Part V, 44, 1956,

See also
Lebor Gabála Érenn

References

Sources

External links

 
 
 
 

1870 births
1950 deaths
Archaeologists from Dublin (city)
Archaeologists of the Near East
Biblical archaeologists
Oghamologists
Presidents of the Royal Irish Academy
People educated at The Perse School